Evander da Silva Ferreira (born 9 June 1998), commonly known as Evander, is a Brazilian professional footballer who plays as an attacking midfielder for Major League Soccer club Portland Timbers.

Club career

Vasco da Gama
Evander debuted for Vasco da Gama on 5 March 2016 as an 85th-minute substitute in a Campeonato Carioca 3–1 win against Bonsucesso. He scored his first professional goal on 8 November 2017 against Santos in the 33rd round of Brazilian Serie A.

On 31 January 2018, Evander became the youngest Vasco da Gama's player to score twice in a Libertadores match, against Universidad de Concepción.

Midtjylland
On 27 August 2018, Vasco confirmed that Evander had been loaned out to FC Midtjylland for the 2018–19 season with a release clause of DKK18 million (around €2.4 million) for the summer of 2019.

Evander made his debut in the Danish Superliga on 29 September 2018 as a 65th-minute substitute for Jakob Poulsen in a 5–1 home win over Hobro IK. The next weekend, on 7 October, he was substituted in with 12 minutes remaining in a 3–0 win over Vendsyssel FF. On 20 October, Evander scored his first goal for Midtjylland in a 4–1 away win over FC Nordsjælland.

In January 2019, FC Midtjylland agreed with Vasco da Gama on a permanent transfer for Evander, agreeing on a future transfer worth a DKK 15m fee, lower than the original release clause. In March 2019, he won the Danish Superliga Player of the Month award.

Portland Timbers
On 5 December 2022, the Portland Timbers acquired Evander in a full transfer from FC Midtjylland. Signed as a Designated Player, Evander is under contract through 2026 with a club option in 2027.

International career
In March 2015, Evander helped the Brazil U17 national team win the Under-17 South American Championship, scoring three goals. He also played at the 2015 FIFA Under-17 World Cup.

Career statistics

Honours
FC Midtjylland
 Danish Superliga: 2019–20
 Danish Cup:  2018–19, 2021–22

References

1998 births
Living people
Brazilian footballers
Footballers from Rio de Janeiro (city)
Association football midfielders
Brazil youth international footballers
Designated Players (MLS)
Campeonato Brasileiro Série A players
Campeonato Brasileiro Série B players
Danish Superliga players
Major League Soccer players
CR Vasco da Gama players
FC Midtjylland players
Portland Timbers players
Brazilian expatriate footballers
Brazilian expatriate sportspeople in Denmark
Expatriate men's footballers in Denmark
Brazilian expatriate sportspeople in the United States
Expatriate soccer players in the United States